Juan Sierra (died 16 February 1374) was a Roman Catholic prelate who served as Bishop of Segovia (1370–1374) and Bishop of Orense (1367–1370).

Biography
On 23 August 1361, Juan Sierra was appointed during the papacy of Pope Innocent VI as Bishop of Orense. In 1367, he was consecrated bishop by Gómez Manrique (bishop), Archbishop of Toledo, with Bishop Gundisalvo, Bishop of Viseu, serving as co-consecrator. On 3 October 1370, he was appointed during the papacy of Pope Urban V as Bishop of Segovia. He served as Bishop of Segovia until his death On 16 February 1374.

References

External links and additional sources
 (for Chronology of Bishops) 
 (for Chronology of Bishops) 
 (for Chronology of Bishops) 
 (for Chronology of Bishops) 

14th-century Roman Catholic bishops in Castile
1374 deaths
Bishops appointed by Pope Innocent VI
Bishops appointed by Pope Urban V